The Business were an English punk band formed in 1979 in Lewisham, South London, England. The band lasted for four decades until their frontman Micky Fitz died from cancer in December 2016.

History
The band was formed in 1979 by school friends Steven ('Steve') Kent (guitar), Michael Fitzsimons ('Micky Fitz') (vocals), Nicholas ('Nick') Cunningham (drums) and Martin Smith (bass). They played their first gig in front of friends in February 1980, and after taking on Lol Pryor as manager, began performing more often. The band's first release was the song "Out in the Cold" on the A Sudden Surge of Sound compilation album. They played their first Oi! concert in 1981, supporting The 4-Skins, and they became closely associated with the Oi! scene from then on. While the Oi! movement was labelled as far right and racist (despite the fact that several Oi! bands played at Rock Against Racism concerts), The Business took a stance against political extremism with their Oi Against Racism and Political Extremism ...But Still Against The System tour. Despite standing apart from the far-right, the band also criticized communists in songs like "Suburban Rebels."

In November 1981, they released their debut single, "Harry May", which spent over three months in the UK Indie Chart, reaching No. 13. The initial line-up split up in late 1981, with Kent, Cunningham, and Smith forming Q-Bow, but Fitz carried on with Pryor, recruiting Graham Ball on guitar, Mark Brennan and Steve Whale from The Blackout, and John Fisher on drums. The new line-up made their live debut in January 1982, after which Ball and Fisher departed, leaving the band as a four-piece, with Kev Boyce of The Blackout on drums. The new line-up recorded the Smash the Discos EP, which was a No. 3 indie hit, and after a short tour, they recorded their debut album, which was to be called Loud, Proud, and Punk. The master tapes for the album went missing after disagreements between the band's label and the studio, forcing them to re-record the album, which was released as Suburban Rebels in May 1983. The album was remixed by their label, Secret, without them knowing, and Secret's financial difficulties limited promotion of the album. Frustrated by this, the band split up, with The Business members forming short-lived bands Chapter and Sabre Dance.

Pryor issued a retrospective album consisting of demos and live tracks on his Syndicate label, the success of which prompted the band to reform and record a what was to be marketed as a live album, Loud, Proud, and Punk. It was recorded in a studio, with crowd noise dubbed in later. Pryor renamed his record label Wonderful World and issued several Business albums in late 1985, with the Drinking and Driving tour following. The name of the tour caused controversy, with tabloid journalists accusing the band of condoning drunk-driving, although the title was tongue-in-cheek.

In late 1986, Brennan and Pryor founded Link Records, and with Brennan becoming increasingly busy running the label, the band split up again. In 1992, Fitz performed a few songs guesting with The Elite and he reformed the band to play a benefit concert for Bobby Moore, who had recently died of cancer. Brennan later started a new record label, Captain Oi! Records and did not join the reformed band. The band's line-up then became Micky Fitz (singer), Steve Whale (guitar), Lol Proctor (bass) and Micky Fairbairn (drums).  The band released a new single "Anywhere But Here" and new album Keep The Faith in 1994. After a number of tours in Western Europe, the band played their first gigs in America in August 1994.  In 1997 The Business released The Truth, The Whole Truth and Nothing But The Truth which was produced by Lars Frederiksen from Rancid. In 2000, the band joined together with Dropkick Murphys to release Mob Mentality. The band's final studio album, No Mercy For You was released in 2001. Their biggest hit song in recent times, "England 5 - Germany 1", (based on the result of a World Cup Qualifying match in 2001), became a football anthem for England and even appeared in the 2004 teen comedy EuroTrip. Despite various line-up changes, the band's popularity continued to grow.

By 2006 Fitz had rebuilt his band after overcoming his alcoholism, this year saw the band take on a 2-month tour of the US with the line-up of Fitz (singer), Robin Guy (drums), Daniel (guitar) and what would become long serving Trots (bass). In September 2006, Fitz recruited long time friend Tosh (of Section 5) to play guitar, shortly followed by Bundie on drums. The band took to the studio in Berlin and recorded three covers, this session featured Mitch Harris of Napalm Death guesting to record the title track 'Mean Girl', originally by one of Fitz's favourite bands Status Quo. This was released by Bad Dog records as an EP, the B side being a live set recorded at the Marquee Club in London from 1982. 

In April 2019, some of the classic line up (Steve Whale, Steve Kent and Micky Fairbairn) joined by JJ Pearce on bass (the Last Resort) performed at the Punk and Disorderly festival in Berlin. Roi Pearce (The Last Resort) Sebi (Stomper 98) and Mike Brands (Arch Rivals) appeared as guest singers. This marked the first time former members of The Business had performed without Micky Fitz playing The Business songs. The same line up, joined by Beki Bondage (Vice Squad) performed at Rebellion 2019. A toast was raised to Fitz's memory at both shows.

Death of Micky Fitz
In late 2015, Micky Fitz was diagnosed with cancer of the lymph gland and underwent radiotherapy. On 1 December 2016 it was announced that Fitz had died.

Discography
Chart placings shown are from the UK Indie Chart.

Studio albums

Singles/EPs

Compilation and live albums

Compilation appearances
 A Sudden Surge of Sound LP (1980) VU
 Carry On Oi! LP (1981) Secret
 Oi! Oi! That's Yer Lot! LP (1982) Secret
 The Secret Life Of Punks LP (1982) Secret
 Burning Ambitions: A History Of Punk 2 X LP (1982) Cherry Red
 UK/DK LP (1982) Anagram
 Defiant Pose LP (1983) Illegal
 Son Of Oi! LP (1984) Syndicate
 Oi! The Resurrection LP (1987) Link
 Oi! Chartbusters Volume 1 LP (1987) Link
 Oi! Chartbusters Volume 2 LP (1987) Link
 The Sound Of Oi! (1987) Link
 Oi!..The Picture Disc LP (1987) Link
 Oi! Chartbusters Volume 2 LP (1987) Link
 Oi! Chartbusters Volume 3 LP (1988) Link
 Oi!..The Picture Disc Volume 2 LP (1988) Link
 Oi!..That's What I Call Music LP (1988) Link
 Oi!..The Main Event LP (1988) Link
 Oi! Chartbusters Volume 4 LP (1988) Link
 Oi! Chartbusters Volume 5 LP (1989) Link
 Pop Oi! LP (1989) Link
 Oi! Chartbusters Volume 6 LP (1990) Link
 Punk On The Road LP (1990) Skunx
 The Oddities Of Oi! LP (1991) Link
 Heroes And Villains LP (1996) Step-1
 Oi! It's A World League LP (1193) Havin' a Laugh
 Nobody's Heroes (1993) Castle Communications
 The Punk Generation (1993) Castle Communications
 The Voice Of The Street (1995) Pub City Royal
 Kill Your Radio  (IRS, 1995)
 The Punk Rockers (Castle Communications, 1995)
 The Best Of Oi! LP (1996) Dojo
 Secret Records - The Punk Singles Collection Volume 1 LP (1996) Captain Oi!
 Punk & Nasty (1996) Emporio
 Real Punk - The Nasty Years (1996) Cleopatra
 England's Glory (1996) Cherry Red
 Punk Crazy (1996) Castle Pulse
 Anarchy From The UK - Volume 1 (1996) Dojo
 Secret Records - The Punk Singles Collection Volume 2 LP (1996) Captain Oi!
 The Great British Punk Rock Explosion LP (1996) Dojo
 Trouble On The Terraces LP (1996) Step-1
 The Best Of Oi! LP (1996) Dojo
 Punk & Disorderly LP (1996) Step-1
 Tribute To The Smiths (1996) Too Damn Hype
 Forever Blowing Bubbles (1996) Cherry Red
 Punk Power (1996) Emporio
 On The Streets (1997) We Bite
 Give 'Em The Boot  (1997) Hellcat
 Oi! The Tine  (1997) Harry May
 Box Or be Boxed  (1997) Lonsdale
 Down To Margate  (1997) Harry May
 100% British Oi!  (1998) Captain Oi!
 Cheap Shots III (1998) Burning Heart
 Lords Of Oi!  (1998) Dressed To Kill
 Live Hate  (1998) Music Collection
 The World Of Football - The Good, The Bad and the Ugly Of World Football  (1998) Charlton
 Scene Killer Volume 1  (1998) Outsider
 Around The World In 80 Minutes  (1999) Rotten
 The Greatest Punk Of All Time  (1999) Dressed To Kill
 Punk  (1999) Pegasus
 Oi! This Is England  (2000) Dressed To Kill
 Cheap Shots IV  (2000) Burning Heart
 The Worldwide Tribute To Real Oi!  (2000) I Scream
 Spirit Of The Street  (2000) Burning Heart
 Complete Burning Ambitions - A History Of Punk (2001) Cleopatra
 Punk-O-Rama 6 (2001) Epitaph
 Cheap Shots V  (2001) Burning Heart
 Cash From Chaos - Complete Punk Collection (2001) EMI
 Without Warning - It's Punch Drunk IV  (2002) TKO
 Addicted To Oi!  (2002) Captain Oi!
 Riot  (2003) Hepcat
 The Kings Of Street Punk  (2007) G&R
 Oi! This Is Street Punk Volume Two  (2012) Pirates Press

References

External links
The Business on Facebook

Epitaph Records artists
English punk rock groups
Oi! groups
Musical groups established in 1979
Musical groups disestablished in 1988
Musical groups reestablished in 1992
Musical groups disestablished in 2016